The Richard and Mary Alice Frank House is a historic house located at 919 La Loma Road in Pasadena, California. Built in 1957, the house was designed by Buff, Straub, and Hensman. The stucco and wood home has a Modernist design influenced by American Craftsman and Japanese architecture. The home's design features gently sloped roofs with tongue-and-groove overhangs, an exterior with wide glass panels interspersed with thin wood and stucco sections, and exposed wooden framing.

The house was added to the National Register of Historic Places on April 10, 2009.

References

Houses on the National Register of Historic Places in California
Buildings and structures on the National Register of Historic Places in Pasadena, California
Houses in Pasadena, California
Houses completed in 1957
Modernist architecture in California